Eospilarctia chuanxina is a moth of the family Erebidae first described by Cheng-Lai Fang in 1982. It is found in Sichuan, China.

References

Moths described in 1982
Spilosomina